Rade Zagorac (born 12 August 1995) is a Serbian professional basketball player for Avtodor Saratov of the VTB United League. Standing at 6 ft 9 in (2.06 m), he mainly plays at the small forward position.

Professional career
Zagorac began his professional career with Mega Vizura starting with 2012–13 season. He spent the 2013–14 season on loan to Smederevo 1953. He returned to Mega for the 2014–15 season. On 1 October 2015, in the Round 1 game of the Adriatic League against Crvena zvezda, he broke his left arm. He returned to the court on 17 January in a game against Tajfun. Until the end of the season he played a total of 13 Adriatic League games, averaging 13.1 points, 5.9 rebounds and 2.4 assists per game. Mega Leks made it to the Finals where it lost to Crvena zvezda. In April 2015, Zagorac declared himself eligible for the 2015 NBA draft, only to withdraw later. On 2 July 2016, Zagorac signed a new two-year contract with Mega Leks. Over 26 games in the 2016–17 ABA League season, he averaged 15 points, 6.5 rebounds and 2.5 assists per game.

On 23 June 2016, Zagorac was selected with the 35th overall pick in the NBA draft by the Boston Celtics. His draft rights were later traded to the Memphis Grizzlies, for a future first round pick. He played for Grizzlies during the 2017 NBA Summer League. On 17 July 2017, he signed with the Grizzlies. On 16 October, Grizzlies waived him prior the start of the 2017–18 season.

On 28 November 2017, Zagorac signed with Spanish club Real Betis Energía Plus until the end of the 2018–19 season. On 29 June 2018, Real Betis Energía Plus parted ways with Zagorac.

On 30 June 2018, Zagorac signed a two-year deal with Partizan. He left Partizan in July 2022.

3x3 basketball career
Zagorac won the gold medal at the 2012 FIBA 3x3 Under-18 World Championships representing Serbia national 3x3 under-18 team together with Luka Anđušić, Miloš Janković, and Mihajlo Andrić.

Off the court 
Zagorac and Nenad Miljenović established the ABA League Players Union in July 2020. The Union is a non-profit organization and trade union based in Belgrade, Serbia, that represents ABA League players.

See also 
 List of NBA drafted players from Serbia
 Boston Celtics draft history

References

External links
 Rade Zagorac at aba-liga.com
 Rade Zagorac at draftexpress.com
 Rade Zagorac at eurobasket.com

1995 births
Living people
ABA League players
Basketball players from Belgrade
Basketball League of Serbia players
Boston Celtics draft picks
BC Avtodor Saratov players
Real Betis Baloncesto players
KK Mega Basket players
KK Partizan players
KK Smederevo players
Liga ACB players
Serbian expatriate basketball people in Russia
Serbian expatriate basketball people in Spain
Serbian men's basketball players
Serbian men's 3x3 basketball players
Shooting guards
Small forwards